Fencing events were held from 30 September 2022 to 4 October 2022 at Mahatma Mandir, Exhibition Hall 2, Venue 3 Gandhinagar.

Medal table

References

Fencing at multi-sport events
2022 National Games of India
2022 in Indian sport
Fencing competitions in India